Alberto Marghieri (1852–1937) was an Italian jurist and author of a biography about Ferdinando Galiani. He was born in Naples, where he made his career in law and politics. In 1924, he was nominated to the Senate of Italy.

Bibliography
 L'Abate Galiani (1878)

External links
 Alberto Marghieri memorial plaque, Naples 

Italian legal scholars
1852 births
1937 deaths
19th-century jurists
20th-century jurists